Oscar Willis Layne (born 12 June 1918) was a Panamanian racing cyclist.

He was born in Panama City in June 1918 to Barbadian parents. He is the winner of three gold medals, from the Central American and Caribbean Games in 1938, 1946 and 1950. On 30 May 2002, Panama City mayor Juan Carlos Navarro presented him with the key to the city.

References

External links
Photo of Oscar Layne

1918 births
Possibly living people
Panamanian male cyclists
Panamanian people of Barbadian descent
Sportspeople from Panama City